Emilio is a 2008 American drama film written and directed by Kim Jorgensen, starring Walter Perez, Danny Martinez, Alejandro Patiño, Wendell Wright, Jesse Garcia, and Ryan McTavish. It was released theatrically in the U.S. on November 4, 2016.

Plot

Cast 
 Walter Perez as Emilio
 Danny Martinez as Jose
 Alejandro Patiño as Fausto
  Wendell Wright as Octavio (bum)
 Jesse Garcia as Hot Dog Vendor
 Ryan McTavish as Zack

Reception

Critical response 
The film received a favorable critical review by Todd McCarthy (Variety), stating "'Emilio' delivers an engrossing and sometimes vibrant portrait of a naive Mexican kid’s sink-or-swim encounter with the urban beast that is contempo Los Angeles."

References

External links 
   
 

2008 films
2000s Spanish-language films
2008 drama films
American drama films
2008 directorial debut films
2000s English-language films
Films directed by Kim Jorgensen
Films with screenplays by Kim Jorgensen
2000s American films